Archie Gray (born 12 March 2006) is an English professional footballer currently playing as a midfielder for Leeds United.

Club career
Born in Durham, Gray joined Leeds United at under-9 level. He progressed rapidly through the academy, and an agreement had to be met between Leeds United and Gray's school, the St John Fisher Catholic High School in Harrogate, for Gray to miss classes in order to train with the first team, at the request of then-manager Marcelo Bielsa.

On 18 December 2021, Gray was named on the bench for a Premier League game against Arsenal. Had he featured, he would've broken the record for Leeds United's youngest player, set in 1962 by Peter Lorimer. He made the bench a further five times in the 2021–22 season, but did not feature. 

He signed a two-year scholarship deal with Leeds United in September 2022. He is tipped to become a future Leeds United first team player.

Having injured his ankle in pre-season, been struck with a virus before a EFL League Cup tie against Barnsley, and fracturing his toe after stubbing it on a door at home, Gray has been unable to make his professional debut for Leeds United.

International career
Gray has represented England at under-16 and under-17 level. He remains eligible to represent Scotland.

Personal life
He is the son of Andy Gray, the grandson of Frank Gray, and the grand-nephew of Eddie Gray, all of whom played for Leeds United and represented Scotland at international level. His brother, Harry, also plays for the Leeds United academy.

Career statistics

Club

References

2006 births
Living people
Sportspeople from Durham, England
Footballers from County Durham
English footballers
Association football midfielders
Leeds United F.C. players
England youth international footballers
English people of Scottish descent